Communist Party of the Region of Murcia (in Spanish: Partido Comunista de la Región de Murcia), is the federation of the Communist Party of Spain (PCE) in Murcia.

External links
PCRM website

Murcia
Political parties in the Region of Murcia
Political parties with year of establishment missing